Mill Creek is a stream in Benton County, Arkansas and 
McDonald County, Missouri. It is a tributary of Elk River.

Mill Creek was named for a saw mill at its banks.

See also
List of rivers of Arkansas
List of rivers of Missouri

References

Rivers of Benton County, Arkansas
Rivers of McDonald County, Missouri
Rivers of Arkansas
Rivers of Missouri